Jardine's Lookout is one of the 13 constituencies in the Wan Chai District of Hong Kong which was created in 1982.

The constituency loosely covers Jardine's Lookout in Hong Kong Island with the estimated population of 15,337.

Councillors represented

Election results

2010s

2000s

1990s

References

Constituencies of Hong Kong
1994 in Hong Kong
Constituencies of Wan Chai District Council
1994 establishments in Hong Kong
Constituencies established in 1994